The European Society of Aesthetic Surgery (ESAS) is a teaching organization which aims at enhancing the knowledge of cosmetic surgical techniques and concepts. The main aim of the society is to furnish its members with teaching surgical skills. On a yearly basis the society sponsors meetings and workshops. The conference proceedings are published in journals.

Meetings

ESAS sponsors one annual meeting each year to collaborate, share and discuss developments. Past annual meetings were:
Master Class in Facelift 2, January 27–28, 2007, Cambridge Private Hospital, UK
24th International Congress of the French Society of Aesthetic Surgery, May 11–13, 2007, Paris, France
Rhinoplasty Workshop, Società Italiana di Chirurgia Estetica,  May 26, 2007, Rome, Italy
1st International European Congress of European Society of Aesthetic Surgery, June 1–3, 2007, Bucharest, Romania
Varna congress of Beauty Surgery and Antiaging with European Certification Exam, July 1–3, 2007, Varna, Riviera Holiday Club, Bulgaria
The International Symposium - 20 Years of Aesthetic Surgery and Cosmetology, October 11–13, 2007, Chisinau, Republic of Moldova
52nd Meeting and World Congress of the International Academy of Cosmetic Surgery, November 2–3, 2007, Lisbon, Portugal
International Board of Cosmetic Surgery 2008 Examination, February 28 - March 1, 2008, Taipei, Taiwan
International Board Certification in Cosmetic Surgery and Meeting and World Congress of the International Academy of Cosmetic Surgery, November 3–4 and 6-8, 2008, Cartagena, Colombia
52nd IBCS Meeting and World Congress of the International Academy of Cosmetic Surgery November 5–8, 2008, Cartagena, Colombia
25th International Congress of the French Society of Aesthetic Surgery (SFCE) Beautification with Aesthetic Surgery in 2008, May 16–18, 2008, Paris, France
Live Advanced Courses Breast Augmentation Rebelo's Procedure, October 14–15, 2011, Lisbon, Portugal
The International Board of Cosmetic Surgery examination, December 2–3 and 7-8, 2011, Saigon, Vietnam
The International Board of Cosmetic Surgery examination,  December 4–5, 2013, Beijing, China

References

External links 
 

International medical associations of Europe
Plastic surgery organizations